The 1979 Gael Linn Cup, the most important representative competition for elite level participants in the women's team field sport of camogie, was won by Leinster, who defeated Munster in the final, played at Mobhi Road .

Arrangements
Leinster defeated Ulster 4–6 to 0–1 at Russell Park, Blanchardstown. Munster defeated Connacht 4–8 to 0–2. Leinster defeated Munster 1–5 to 0–4 on a wet and cold day at Athboy., where the match was staged to celebrate the 75th anniversary of camogie.

Gael Linn Trophy
Munster defeated Connacht by one point in the trophy semi-final at Páirc Uí Chaoimh, Ulster defeated Leinster at Russell Park by 5–2 to 1–2. Ulster defeated Munster by 0–4 to 1–0 in the final.

Final stages

|}

Junior Final

|}

References

External links
 Camogie Association

1979 in camogie
1979